Gisela Toews (born 27 September 1940) is a retired German speed skater. She competed at the 1960 Winter Olympics in the 1500 m and 3000 m events and finished in 22nd and 17th place, respectively. 

Personal bests:
500 m – 52.2 (1960)
 1000 m – 1:48.6 (1960)
 1500 m – 2:44.0 (1960)
 3000 m – 5:48.3 (1960)

References

External links

1940 births
German female speed skaters
Speed skaters at the 1960 Winter Olympics
Olympic speed skaters of the United Team of Germany
Living people
20th-century German women